Adire may refer to:
One of the Enochian angels
Adire (textile art), a style of decorated Nigerian Yoruba textiles
Adire Legal Professional Corporation, a Japanese law firm